The Monster Jam World Finals is an annual monster truck event that is the championship event of the Monster Jam series, consisting of racing and freestyle competitions, with the winner of each considered the World Champion in that competition for the past year. It is the highest-profile monster truck event with the greatest media attention. From 2000 to 2018, the event was held in late March at Sam Boyd Stadium in Las Vegas, Nevada. Starting in 2019, the plan was to rotate venues each year, but instead, it was decided the World Finals would be held at Camping World Stadium in Orlando, Florida until 2022. The World Finals will be held at Nissan Stadium in Nashville, Tennessee in July 2023.

Background
Originally, 16 trucks were invited to compete in the event, but 20 trucks were selected in 2005, 24 selected from 2006 to 2012, 28 in 2013, and 32 trucks from 2014–present. For the first 14 years of the Monster Jam World Finals, the Racing Championship and Freestyle Championship were held on the same night. From 2014 to 2017, however, the event expanded to a 3-day format with Double Down on Thursday, the Racing Championship on Friday, and the Freestyle Championship on Saturday. In 2018 the World Finals will move back to a 2-day format with the Double Down festivities and Racing Championship all taking place on Friday, and the Freestyle Championship on Saturday, with qualifying going back to a private event only for drivers and staff on Thursday. Trucks and drivers are selected based on their performances over the winter season on the FS1 Championship Series, Triple Threat Series, and other events from January into early March. When multiple drivers of the same team or truck are selected, they were typically placed in other trucks, e.g. Pablo Huffaker won the 2007 Freestyle Championship driving Captain's Curse and Charlie Pauken won the 2010 Freestyle Championship driving Monster Mutt. Since 2015, however, most drivers have driven their own trucks but with different paint schemes and flags sporting the drivers' names. This approach has allowed there to be multiple trucks of the same team in the main field, which has led to some controversy among fans. While only 32 trucks compete for the World Racing and Freestyle Championships, and only 16 trucks compete for the Double Down Showdown Championship, there are over 100 trucks that are invited to be on display at the Pit Party festivities during the event.

The stature of the event leads to extreme performances in both competitions. The racing track, being about 884 feet in length, starts in the parking lot behind the locker rooms of the stadium and features a long straight-away offering speeds over 70 mph before a hair-pin turn. The freestyle track layout is typically the most extreme all season with several large and unique obstacles often producing spectacular air, saves, crashes and other jaw-dropping tricks. Beginning in 2014 with the new 3-day format, the track has been specifically designed for each individual competition. The track is first built to attribute Racing, but upon its completion on Friday night, the track construction crew completely rebuilds the track overnight for Freestyle on Saturday. The event typically featured 7 judges (6 regulation, who scored from 1–10 for 90 seconds, and 1 bonus judge, who scored from 1–5 for the next 30 seconds) with the lowest and highest scores discarded in regulation for a maximum possible score of 45 (excluding tiebreakers). Beginning in 2014, the judges could give half points as opposed to only giving whole points to further distinguish and separate each freestyle run. The scoring was updated in 2017 where all the fans inside Sam Boyd Stadium got to be the judges. After each driver's run, everyone had 20 seconds to lock in a score from 1–10 using 0.25 increments through Monster Jam's official judging website. The fan scores would then be averaged out to give a final score for the freestyle run; for example: 6.328.

No truck has ever got the maximum score of 45 (40 in regulation and 5 in bonus). The high score is 40 and was set by Dennis Anderson in Grave Digger in 2000.
In the history of the Monster Jam World Finals Freestyle Championship, only once has a driver successfully defended his title the following year: Tom Meents driving Goldberg in 2001 and Team Meents in 2002.

In 2004, if a driver flipped over within the first 30 seconds of their run, they would be allowed to roll back over and continue depending on if the truck was still able to go. This rule was only active that year.

Some fans consider the Monster Jam World Finals unfair, because its invitation-only participants are not officially selected based on performance scores earned during the prior season. Another controversy is that the event's parent company, Feld Motorsports, owns a majority of the trucks that are invited to participate. Additionally, most of the participant drivers are based in the United States. However, this selection bias is often countered by the fact that Monster Jam organizes a world tour.

Until 2011, the teams qualified for racing with no body on the chassis so they would not be damaged if an accident was to occur, although some drivers kept the front hood on in order to give them a point of view as if they were racing with the body on. However, from 2012–present, all teams had to qualify with full bodies on. Each driver gets 2 practice runs, one in the left lane and one in the right lane, in order to give them a feel of the track in both lanes. Also starting in 2012, Feld Motorsports added a new competition to the World Finals as part of the Double Down experience called the Young Guns Shootout, where 8 competitors with no prior World Finals experience compete in racing for the title of Young Guns Shootout Champion. The Young Guns Shootout field expanded to 12 trucks in 2013, 14 trucks in 2014, and 16 trucks from 2015–present. Whoever is crowned The Young Guns Shootout Champion receives the final spot in the field of 32 trucks to compete for the World Racing Championship and World Freestyle Championship. In 2017 the Young Guns Shootout was renamed the Double Down Showdown and the winner would be named the Double Down Showdown Champion, still receiving the 32nd and final spot in the World Finals main field. The Double Down Showdown is no longer an event just for rookies, as it now allows indies and other trucks of that matter.

World Champions

Young Guns Shootout/Double Down Showdown Champions

Motor Madness "World Finals 0" (Unofficial) — April 3, 1999

Racing

World Finals I — March 25, 2000

Racing

Freestyle

World Finals II — March 24, 2001

Racing

Freestyle

World Finals III — March 23, 2002

Racing

Freestyle

World Finals IV — March 22, 2003

Racing

Freestyle

World Finals V — March 20, 2004

Racing

Freestyle

World Finals VI — March 19, 2005

Racing

Freestyle

World Finals VII — March 25, 2006

Racing

Freestyle

Encore
Grave Digger (Charlie Pauken) and Maximum Destruction (Neil Elliott) dual-freestyle.

World Finals VIII — March 24, 2007

Racing
{{5RoundBracket|byes=1|compact=y|legs=0
|RD1-seed3=16
|RD1-seed4=24
|RD1-seed7=9
|RD1-seed8=17
|RD1-seed11=12
|RD1-seed12=20
|RD1-seed15=13
|RD1-seed16=21
|RD1-seed19=14
|RD1-seed20=22
|RD1-seed23=11
|RD1-seed24=19
|RD1-seed27=10
|RD1-seed28=18
|RD1-seed31=15
|RD1-seed32=23
|RD1-team3=Pastrana 199
|RD1-team4=Hot Wheels
|RD1-team7=Taz
|RD1-team8=US Air Force Afterburner
|RD1-team11=Blue Thunder
|RD1-team12=Team Suzuki
|RD1-team15=Brutus
|RD1-team16=Avenger
|RD1-team19=Teenage Mutant Ninja Turtle (Crashed)
|RD1-team20=Destroyer
|RD1-team23=Captain's Curse
|RD1-team24=Superman
|RD1-team27=An Escalade
|RD1-team28=King Krunch
|RD1-team31=El Toro Loco
|RD1-team32=Monster Mutt Dalmatian
|RD2-seed1=1
|RD2-seed3=8
|RD2-seed5=5
|RD2-seed7=4
|RD2-seed9=3
|RD2-seed11=6
|RD2-seed13=7
|RD2-seed15=2
|RD2-team1=Bounty Hunter
|RD2-team2=Hot Wheels
|RD2-team3=Batman
|RD2-team4=US Air Force Afterburner
|RD2-team5=Monster Mutt
|RD2-team6=Blue Thunder
|RD2-team7=Maximum Destruction
|RD2-team8=Brutus
|RD2-team9=Iron Outlaw
|RD2-team10=Destroyer (Returned)
|RD2-team11=Scarlet Bandit
|RD2-team12=Captain's Curse
|RD2-team13=Grave Digger #20
|RD2-team14=An Escalade
|RD2-team15=Safe Auto Minimizer
|RD2-team16=Monster Mutt Dalmatian
|RD3-team1=Hot Wheels
|RD3-team2=Batman
|RD3-team3=Monster Mutt
|RD3-team4=Maximum Destruction
|RD3-team5=Iron Outlaw
|RD3-team6=Captain's Curse
|RD3-team7=Grave Digger #20|RD3-team8=Safe Auto Minimizer
|RD4-team1= Batman |RD4-team2=Monster Mutt
|RD4-team3=Captain's Curse
|RD4-team4=Grave Digger #20|RD5-team1=Batman|RD5-team2=Grave Digger #20
}}

Freestyle

Encore
5 25th Anniversary Grave Diggers commemorate Grave Digger's 25th anniversary.

World Finals IX — March 28–29, 2008

Racing

Freestyle

Encore

Between Rounds 1 and 2: 
Teenage Mutant Ninja Turtle (Randy Brown) freestyle

After Event: 
Backwards Bob (Mike Wine) and Spitfire (Gary Porter) debut in a dual-freestyle. Maximum Destruction freestyle (Tom Meents) with a similar crash to the one earlier in the night.

World Finals X — March 27–28, 2009

Racing

Freestyle

Encore
Maximum Destruction attempts a successful backflip, which results in a 1½ backflip by Tom Meents.

World Finals XI — March 26–27, 2010

Racing

Freestyle

Encores

10 trucks freestyle to celebrate 10 years of Monster Jam World Finals: 
Scarlet Bandit - Dawn Creten, 
The Patriot - Dan Rodoni, 
CULT Energy Activator - Sean Duhon, 
Wrecking Crew - Chris Bergeron, 
Blue Thunder - Frank Krmel, 
Madusa (Susan G. Koman Breast Cancer Awareness tribute style truck) - Madusa, 
Mohawk Warrior (debut) - George Balhan, 
Dennis Anderson (modern Grave Digger), Ryan Anderson (red pickup style Grave Digger) and Adam Anderson (Grave Digger The Legend) triple freestyle. At the end of the encore, Dennis' Grave Digger and Ryan Anderson in the red pickup Grave Digger collide in the air after jumping off a steep ramp.

World Finals XII — March 25–26, 2011

Racing

Freestyle

Encore
All 3 Advance Auto Parts Grinder drivers in their trucks (Lupe Soza, John Seasock, and Frank Krmel).
All 3 Maximum Destruction drivers in their trucks (Tom Meents, Neil Elliott, Kreg Christensen).
Ryan Anderson debuts Son-Uva Digger and completes a successful backflip in the truck.

World Finals XIII — March 23–24, 2012

Racing

Young Guns Shootout

The Young Guns Shootout is when drivers with less than 2 years of experience will compete in Las Vegas. It is Friday Night at the Double Down. 
The qualifiers are...

Freestyle

Encore
Seven Grave Digger trucks competed to celebrate 30 Years of Grave Digger. Four black 30th Anniversary Grave Diggers were driven by Pablo Huffaker, Chad Tingler, Gary Porter and Ryan Anderson; Grave Digger The Legend - Adam Anderson; "Grandma" Digger - Charlie Pauken; and the Purple 30th Anniversary Grave Digger - Dennis Anderson. Note: Ryan Anderson broke his neck when four of the seven Diggers performed backflips and was sidelined until Minneapolis, Minnesota, in December 2012.

World Finals XIV – March 22–23, 2013
Racing

Freestyle

Encore
Neil Elliott, Kreg Christensen, Chuck Werner and Tom Meents in 4 Max-D trucks.  Neil, Kreg and Chuck perform back-flips together; Tom Meents comes out in his Max-D truck being lifted off a Max-D dump truck, and performs the first successful double backflip. This celebrated 10 Years of Maximum Destruction.

 World Finals XV — March 20–22, 2014

Racing
{|class="wikitable" style="font-size:90%;"
!width="11%"|Round 1!!width="11%"|Round 2!!width="11%"|Round 3!!width="11%"|Semi-Finals!!width="11%"|Championship Race!!width="11%"|Semi-Finals!!width="11%"|Round 3!!width="11%"|Round 2!!width="11%"|Round 1
|-
|Grave Digger #30||rowspan="2"|Grave Digger #30||rowspan="4"|Grave Digger #30||rowspan="8"|Grave Digger #30||rowspan="8"|Grave DiggerThe Legend||rowspan="8"|Max-D||rowspan="4"|Max-D||rowspan="2"|Max-D||Max-D|-
|Titan||Avenger (Crashed)
|-
|Northern Nightmare||rowspan="2"|Northern Nightmare||rowspan="2"|Mohawk Warrior||Mohawk Warrior|-
|Man of Steel||Captain America
|-
|Lucas Oil Crusader||rowspan="2"|Lucas Oil Crusader||rowspan="4"|Lucas Oil Crusader||rowspan="4"|Bounty Hunter||rowspan="2"|Bounty Hunter||Bounty Hunter|-
|FS1 Cleatus||Team Hot WheelsFirestorm
|-
|Spider-Man||rowspan="2"|Spider-Man||rowspan="2"|Son-uva Digger||Son-uva Digger|-
|The Patriot||Stone Crusher
|-
|Zombie||rowspan="2"|Monster Mutt||rowspan="4"|Wolverine||rowspan="8"|Grave DiggerThe Legend||rowspan="8"|Max-D||rowspan="8"|Iron Man ||rowspan="4"|Monster Energy||rowspan="2"|Monster Energy||Barbarian
|-
|Monster Mutt||Monster Energy|-
|Wolverine||rowspan="2"|Wolverine (Crashed)||rowspan="2"|El Toro Loco||Monster Mutt Dalmatian
|-
|Overkill Evolution||El Toro Loco|-
|Monster Mutt Rottweiler||rowspan="2"|Captain's Curse||rowspan="4"|Grave DiggerThe Legend||rowspan="4"|Iron Man||rowspan="2"|Metal Mulisha||Bad Habit
|-
|Captain's Curse||Metal Mulisha|-
|Madusa||rowspan="2"|Grave DiggerThe Legend||rowspan="2|Iron Man||Scooby-Doo
|-
|Grave Digger The Legend'||rowspan=1|Iron Man

|}

Freestyle

Encore

Racing Encore: Young Guns do donuts and Marvel Trucks do backflips.

Freestyle Encore:Six Doom's Day Trucks come out and all perform backflips.

World Finals XVI — March 26–28, 2015

Racing

Young Guns Shootout

Freestyle

Encore

Young Guns Shootout: All of the Young Guns came out for a donut performance, while New Earth Authority and El Diablo perform backflips.
Racing: many of the Young Guns do a donut performance, Dragon, El Toro Loco and NEA (BLUE) do a train jump over the center stack.
Freestyle - Different Zombie monster trucks go out and crash into each other while hauling dead bodies. Each Zombie truck has a different look: two original Zombies, one Red Zombie, one Yellow Zombie (based on a girl), one Green Zombie (based on a biker), and one White Zombie (based on a skull) (not to be confused with the band White Zombie).

World Finals XVII — March 17–19, 2016

Racing Bracket

Freestyle

Young Guns Shootout

Racing Bracket

World Finals XVIII — March 23–25, 2017

Racing

Freestyle

 Randy Brown replaced Cole Venard for Cole leaving Team Grave Digger, and moving with his family. 
 Alex Blackwell replaced Justin Sipes for undisclosed reasons.

Double Down Showdown

Encore
Double Down Showdown: All of the Showdown competitors came out for a donut performance.
Racing: Neil Elliott came out in the Monster Jam 25th Anniversary truck and did a forward momentum backflip over Son-uva Digger. All competing and non-competing trucks came out on the track to salute the fans for being a part of Monster Jam for 25 years.
Freestyle: Adam Anderson, Ryan Anderson, Krysten Anderson and the rest of the Grave Digger team came out and freestyled for Grave Digger's 35th Anniversary. Dennis Anderson announced his retirement from monster truck racing.

World Finals XIX — March 23–24, 2018
The 2018 Monster Jam World Finals took place at Sam Boyd Stadium in Las Vegas, Nevada on March 23–24, 2018. World Finals XIX moved back to a 2-day format. However, the Racing Championship and Freestyle Championship were still separated between Friday and Saturday respectively, with the Double Down Showdown taking place on Friday night before Racing. This was the last World Finals to take place in Las Vegas.

Racing

Bracket

Freestyle

Double Down Showdown

Double Down Racing Bracket

Bracket

Encore
Racing: Tom Meents, Neil Elliott, Colton Eichelberger, Chuck Werner, and Jared Eichelberger each came out in their own separate Max-D trucks to help celebrate Max-D's 15th anniversary. A new black Max-D paint scheme was unveiled during the encore as well. Chuck drove the original Maximum Destruction, Neil drove the Candy Apple Red Max-D, Colton drove the Gold Max-D, Jared drove the normal Max-D, and Tom debuted the new Black Max-D. Each truck did different tricks throughout the encore as well.
Freestyle: The three new Rampage trucks (George - Tom Meents, Ralph, and Lizzie) came out and hit a series of buildings set up for the trucks. Two Soldier Fortune trucks came out to reprimand Ralph and Lizzie. The three Rampage trucks then did their own backflips, with George (driven by Meents) almost completing a double backflip. Afterwards, all the Racing competitors, Freestyle competitors, Double Down competitors, and display trucks came out and flooded the track.

World Finals XX — May 10–11, 2019
The 2019 Monster Jam World Finals took place at Camping World Stadium in Orlando, Florida, May 10–11, 2019.

Originally, MetLife Stadium was announced to host World Finals XX, but a scheduling change prevented them from hosting. World Finals XX was the first World Finals outside of Las Vegas. The new location was announced on September 5, 2018. The number of trucks reverted to 24, like it was from 2006 to 2012.

Showdown

Racing

Freestyle

Great Clips 2 Wheel Skills Challenge

High Jump

Speedster Racing

ATV Racing

Speedster Obstacle Course

World Finals XXI — May 21-22, 2022
The 2020 Monster Jam World Finals were scheduled to take place at Camping World Stadium for the second straight year on May 2–3, 2020. On March 27, 2020, the event was cancelled due to public health concerns regarding the international coronavirus pandemic. This is the first time in Monster Jam history that the World Finals were cancelled. Monster Jam announced in September 2021 that World Finals would return in 2022 at Camping World Stadium in Orlando, FL.

Racing

Great Clips 2 Wheel Skills Challenge

High Jump

Freestyle

World Finals XXII — July 1, 2023
On May 19, 2022, it was announced that Nissan Stadium in Nashville, Tennessee will serve as the venue for the twenty-second World Finals. On June 23, 2022, it was announced that the World Finals will move back to a single day event, to be held on July 1, 2023, with the Two-Wheels Skills, High Jump, Racing and Freestyle competitions returning.

Racing/Freestyle
 Tour Points Leaders after Week 10 of competition.
 Italics indicates the driver/truck are leading their tour, but have not yet clinched a berth in the event.

References

External links
 http://www.monsterjam.com

Monster trucks